Finnvollvatnet is a lake in the municipality of Namsos in Trøndelag county, Norway. The lake flows out into the Sverka river which eventually ends up in the Namsenfjorden.

See also
List of lakes in Norway

References

Namsos
Lakes of Trøndelag